Povlsen is a Danish surname. Notable people with the surname include:

Anders Holch Povlsen (born 1972), Danish billionaire
Flemming Povlsen (born 1966), Danish former professional football player
Kasper Povlsen (born 1989), Danish footballer
Troels Holch Povlsen (born 1949), Danish businessman, founder of fashion chain Bestseller

Danish-language surnames